West Salem High School (also referred to as West Salem High, West Salem HS, or WSHS) is a public high school of the Salem-Keizer School District located in Salem, Oregon, United States.

Academics
In 2008, 82% of the school's seniors received a high school diploma. Of 339 students, 279 graduated, 29 dropped out, five received a modified diploma, and 26 were still in high school the following year. As of 2017, 1,732 students were enrolled at West Salem High School. At that time, its graduation rate was 89%. The 2017 class of 414 had 37 dropouts, and 87% of the class were graduating on time.

The Titan Spectator
West Salem High School is home to the award winning Titan Spectator newspaper. Their mission statement is "to cover school and city happenings, from the serious to the comical ... [and] to engage students in their school and community". They were previously cut as a class which caused public backlash  They are also known for their mass social base of community members

Maps Credit Union Education Branch
West Salem High School is one of three high schools in Salem, Oregon which are home to an education branch of Marion and Polk Schools Credit Union.

MAPS Credit Union education branches provide an opportunity for high school students to participate in the day-to-day operations of a real credit union. Students in certain business classes spend a small amount of time conducting real teller transactions for other students during lunch hours, under the supervision of a trained faculty member. The school's branch has been open since 2003.

Black football field 
In 2012, West Salem installed a new black FieldTurf surface for its football field, believed to be the first of that color ever used for outdoor football (the Nebraska Danger of the Indoor Football League also use this color). The decision to use a black surface came about when the school's original green FieldTurf surface, installed in 2002, needed replacing. FieldTurf offered the school a discount of nearly $140,000 from the regular $437,000 replacement cost if it used an "unusual" color; West Salem chose black since it was a school color and also had not previously been used by another school. The school changed its home uniform color from black to green in order to avoid possible complaints by visiting teams about the uniforms blending into the field. The field and uniforms were fully paid for through fundraisers, including four local business sponsors. However, as of 2015, the school has now started to use black uniforms with grey numbers.
As of 2020, the field has reverted to green.

Notable students
 Ryan Allen - American football player
 Brett Smith - American football player 
Alec Palm - 75th Oregon Youth Governor

See also
 Michael Stephen Lampert (former teacher)
 Micah Masei (alumnus)

References

High schools in Salem, Oregon
Educational institutions established in 2002
High schools in Polk County, Oregon
2002 establishments in Oregon
Public high schools in Oregon